Nonentity (Water III: Fan Black Dada) is the ninth studio album by experimental rock composer Zoogz Rift, released in May 1988 by SST Records.

Release and reception 

Richard Foss of AllMusic noted the more intimate tone of the material and claimed that "the quieter, more intimate setting fits the song very well." Critics of the Trouser Press said that the album was an excellent showcase of the band's talent coupled with Rift's unique guitar playing style.

Track listing

Personnel 
Adapted from the Nonentity (Water III: Fan Black Dada) liner notes.
 Zoogz Rift – guitar, vocals, production, illustration

Musicians
 Richie Hass – drums, percussion
 Toby Holmes – trombone, tuba
 Rocky Howard – accordion
 Willie Lapin – bass guitar

Additional Musicians
 John Trubee – guitar ("The Enigmatic Embrocation of Mrs. Compost Heap")
 Craig Unkrich – synthesizer (B1, B3, "The Enigmatic Embrocation of Mrs. Compost Heap")
Production and additional personnel
 John Golden – mastering
 Marc Mylar – recording, photography

Release history

References

External links 
 Nonentity (Water III: Fan Black Dada) at iTunes
 

1988 albums
SST Records albums
Zoogz Rift albums